Kobi is a village in the historical region of Khevi, Georgia. Administratively, it is part of the Kazbegi Municipality in Mtskheta-Mtianeti. It is a community center of Truso Valley villages. Distance to the municipality center Stepantsminda is 20 km.

Transportation 
The village is located on the Georgian Military Road.

Climate

Notable people 
Kobi is a birthplace of Vaso Abaev, a well known Soviet Iranist of Ossetian descent.

Sources 
 Georgian Soviet Encyclopedia, V. 5, p. 566, Tbilisi, 1980 year.

References

Kobi Community villages
Populated places in Kazbegi Municipality
Tiflis Governorate